Tony Thomas (also known as Tony "Strat" Thomas), (born June 2, 1959 – February 6, 2022) was an American funk and rock guitarist from Highland Park, Michigan U.S., and was best known for his work with George Clinton, Parliament, and the P-Funk All-Stars. Thomas also recorded extensively with Muruga Booker, and was a guitarist in Muruga Cosmic Boogie and Muruga Blues All-Stars.

As a teenager, Thomas fell in love with the sound of the Fender Stratocaster guitar, and his mother eventually bought him one, earning him the nickname "Strat" ever since. He quickly learned how to play and he soon joined a Detroit, Michigan reggae band called Onyx.

In 1979, Thomas and Donnie Sterling formed a P-Funk offspring group called Sterling Silver Starship, and an album was recorded, but was never released. Thomas and Sterling left Sterling Silver Starship in 1981 and formed a group, Kiddo, and they recorded a self-titled album that was released by A&M Records.

In 1982 Thomas played guitar on George Clinton's first solo recording project Computer Games, which included the hit songs Atomic Dog and Loopzilla. Thomas went on to record through the 1980s with P-Funk, and was featured on many of their biggest-selling records.

In 2014 Thomas joined fellow P-Funk All-Star Muruga Booker to form Muruga & The Cosmic Hoedown Band (later changed to Muruga Cosmic Boogie), and they recorded several projects including a couple with George Clinton and several other members of the P-Funk All Stars.  In 2015 Thomas and Muruga & The Cosmic Hoedown Band performed at the eighth annual Concert of Colors in Detroit, Michigan, performing with the Don Was Detroit All-Star Revue, and was a featured soloist playing Maggot Brain.

In 2017 Thomas and Booker also formed a blues band called Booker Blues All-Stars and recorded an album in honor of John Lee Hooker's 100th anniversary birthday celebration, called Booker Plays Hooker, which also features Rock & Roll Hall of Fame inductee J.C. "Billy" Davis, Peter Madcat Ruth, Misty Love, John Sauter, and Shakti Booker.

Thomas' guitar work with George Clinton and Parliament-Funkadelic related projects has been sampled by many artists, including Snoop Dogg, Dr. Dre, Ice Cube, Digital Underground, Too Short, Tweedy Bird Loc and Ruthless Rap Assassins.

Due to his guitar tone and playing style, Thomas has been compared to Jimi Hendrix and Eddie Hazel.

Thomas died on February 6, 2022. Two hours after George Clinton announced the death of Tony Thomas on his Facebook page, Eric Brenner confirmed the story with Steve Muruga Booker. Booker told Brenner that Tony "Strat" Thomas died on a couch at band practice.

Discography
1980 – Parliament – Trombipulation
1981 – Funkadelic – The Electric Spanking of War Babies
1982 – George Clinton – Computer Games
1983 – Kiddo – Kiddo
1983 – P-Funk All Stars – Urban Dancefloor Guerillas
1983 – P-Funk All Stars – Hydraulic Funk
1985 – Jimmy G. & The Tackheads – Federation Of Tackheads	
1993 – Parliament – Tear the Roof Off 1974–1980
1993 – George Clinton / George Clinton & the P-Funk All-Stars – Family Series, Vol. 1: Go Fer Yer Funk
1993 – George Clinton / George Clinton & the P-Funk All-Stars – Family Series, Vol. 2: Plush Funk
1993 – George Clinton / George Clinton & the P-Funk All-Stars – Family Series, Vol. 3: P Is the Funk
1994 – George Clinton And The P-Funk All Stars – P-Funk Unreleased Remix
1994 – George Clinton / George Clinton & the P-Funk All-Stars – Family Series, Vol. 4 – Testing Positive 4 The Funk
1995 – George Clinton / George Clinton & the P-Funk All-Stars – Family Series, Vol. 5 – A Fifth of Funk
1995 – Parliament – The Best of Parliament: Give Up the Funk
1996 – George Clinton – Greatest Funkin' Hits
1998 – George Clinton and The P-Funk Allstars – Funk Permission Card<ref>George Clinton and The P-Funk Allstars* - Funk Permission Card George Clinton and The P-Funk Allstars – Funk Permission Card at Discogs]</ref>
2000 – Parliament – The Best Of Parliament
2000 – Parliament – 20th Century Masters - The Millennium Collection: The Best of Parliament
2005 – Parliament – Gold
2014 – The New Newz – Deer Dreamers
2015 – Muruga & The Cosmic Hoedown Band meet George Clinton & P-Funk All-Stars – The Fathership – Mothership World Connection
2016 – Wormhole Cafe (feat. P-Funk All-Stars & more) – At The Wormhole Cafe2016 – Muruga & The Cosmic Hoedown Band – Harmonious World
2017 – Booker Blues All Stars – Booker Plays Hooker''

References

Living people
P-Funk members
American funk guitarists
American funk musicians
American blues guitarists
African-American male guitarists
Lead guitarists
Rhythm guitarists
American rock musicians
American bandleaders
People from Highland Park, Michigan
Guitarists from Detroit
20th-century American guitarists
21st-century American guitarists
20th-century African-American male singers
21st-century African-American male singers
African-American rock musicians
People from Wayne County, Michigan
Singers from Detroit
1959 births